The AGM-159 was a missile design proposed in 1996 by the Boeing (McDonnell-Douglas) company as a contender in the U.S. Air Force's JASSM project. Development halted after Lockheed Martin's AGM-158 was selected for further development in 1998.

See also
AGM-158 JASSM
List of missiles

Cruise missiles of the United States
Abandoned military rocket and missile projects of the United States